Lafon is located in Eastern Equatoria State of South Sudan, the headquarters of Lafon County.
The people belong to the Pari ethnic group.
Lafon Hill is a small, rocky elevation that rises abruptly from the surrounding plain.
It is covered with terraced, Pari villages.
Traditionally the people made their living primarily from cattle herding.

References

Populated places in Eastern Equatoria